The Tour of Gymnastics Superstars was a nationwide concert tour that showcases the talents of 17 American gymnasts  as well as  recording artists Jordan Pruitt, Carly Patterson, and KSM.  The tour visited 34 different cities in over twenty states across the continental United States.

The first show, in Reno, Nevada, was taped for a national broadcast on  MyNetworkTV and included a musical performance by Hannah Montana actor Mitchel Musso.

Tapings of the second show, in San Diego, California, was included in Frosted Pink with a Twist, which is a television special about women's cancers (gymnast Shawn Johnson has a grandmother who is a cancer survivor).   Was broadcast on ABC on October 12, 2008, the television special also features singers Jesse McCartney, Kenny Loggins, and Grammy Award singers Cyndi Lauper and Carole King .

Tour dates

Cast

Female athletes 

 
(in alphabetical order by last name)
Shawn Johnson
Nastia Liukin
Chellsie Memmel
Shannon Miller
Ashley Postell
Samantha Peszek
Bridget Sloan
Shayla Worley (removed from cast due to discipline issues)
Alicia Sacramone (replaced Shayla Worley)

Male athletes 

(in alphabetical order by last name)
Alexander Artemev
Raj Bhavsar
Joseph Hagerty
Morgan Hamm
Paul Hamm
Jonathan Horton
Justin Spring
Kevin Tan
Blaine Wilson

Support Cast 
(in alphabetical order by last name)
Aliane Baquerot
Olga Karmansky
Vladmir Sizov
Mam Smith
Luke Vexler

See also 
 Gold Over America Tour

References

External links

 Official Website

Gymnastics in the United States